John Breckinridge or Breckenridge may refer to:

John Breckinridge (U.S. Attorney General) (1760–1806), U.S. Senator and U.S. Attorney General
John C. Breckinridge (1821–1875), U.S. Representative and Senator, 14th Vice President of the United States, and Confederate general in the American Civil War
John B. Breckinridge (1913–1979), Attorney General of Kentucky and U.S. Representative
John Cabell Breckinridge (1903–1996), best known as Bunny Breckinridge, American actor
John Robert Breckinridge, member of the prominent Breckinridge family

See also
John Brackenridge (disambiguation)